Almir Ajzeraj (born 5 October 1997) is a Kosovan professional footballer who plays as an left midfielder for Kosovan club FC Drita.

Club career

Skënderbeu Korçë
On 23 July 2018, Ajzeraj joined Albanian Superliga side Skënderbeu Korçë, on a four-year contract. On 17 August 2018, he made his debut in a 1–0 home win against Partizani Tirana after coming on as a substitute at 73rd minute in place of Nazmi Gripshi.

Loan at Ballkani
On 28 January 2019, Ajzeraj joined Football Superleague of Kosovo side Ballkani, on loan until the end of 2018–19 season. On 10 February 2019, he made his debut with Ballkani in the quarter-final of 2018–19 Kosovar Cup against Kika after being named in the starting line-up. He made his league appearance on 16 February after being named in the starting line-up in a 2–0 home win against Drenica.

International career
On 21 March 2017, Ajzeraj received a call-up from Kosovo U21 for a 2019 UEFA European Under-21 Championship qualification match against Republic of Ireland U21 and made his debut after coming on as a substitute at 68th minute in place of Leonard Pllana.

References

External links

1997 births
Living people
Sportspeople from Pristina
Kosovo Albanians
Association football midfielders
Kosovan footballers
Kosovan expatriate footballers
Kosovo youth international footballers
Football Superleague of Kosovo players
KF Flamurtari players
KF KEK players
KF Ballkani players
FC Drita players
Kategoria Superiore players
KF Skënderbeu Korçë players
Kosovan expatriate sportspeople in Albania
Expatriate footballers in Albania